Johnson Lake is a small lake on the Kenai Peninsula in the state of Alaska. It covers about 84 acres and is stocked with Pacific salmon, coho salmon, steelhead, and rainbow trout.

The lake is surrounded by Johnson Lake State Recreation Area, which consists of 332 wooded acres (134 ha) with a large campground, picnic areas, and access to the Tustumena Lake road, which ends at the Slackwater boat launch on the river with a small, free campground. Camping, fishing, canoeing and walking are popular activities in the recreation area. There are 48 campsites, 16 day use parking sites, and a group picnic area. Moose, black and brown bear, lynx, squirrels, and hares are plentiful.

See also
List of lakes of Alaska

References

Rivers of Kenai Peninsula Borough, Alaska
Rivers of the Kenai Peninsula